Aristoptychites is an extinct genus of cephalopod from the Anisian stage of the Middle Triassic belonging to the ammonoid subclass.

Shell involute, whorls strongly embraced, venter acutely rounded. Suture curved, subammonitic; more closely resembles that of Flexoptychites or  Discoptychites than of other ptychitids.

References 

 
  Aristoptychites Paleobiology Database, 6/8/12

Ptychitaceae
Fossils of Svalbard
Ceratitida genera
Triassic ammonites
Anisian life